Mullikarambur muthuraja   is a village in the Srirangam taluk of Tiruchirappalli district in Tamil Nadu, India. As per the 2001 census, Mullikarambur had a population of 1,442 with 704 males and 734 females. The sex ratio was 1,048 and the literacy rate, 71.59.

References 
 

Villages in Tiruchirappalli district